The Brit Award for Best New Artist (previously Brit Award for British Breakthrough Act) is an award given by the British Phonographic Industry (BPI), an organisation which represents record companies and artists in the United Kingdom. The accolade is presented at the Brit Awards, an annual celebration of British and international music. The winners and nominees are determined by the Brit Awards voting academy with over 1,000 members, which comprise record labels, publishers, managers, agents, media, and previous winners and nominees.

Throughout it's tenure, the category has been known by a number of different names. Originally presented as two gendered categories in 1977, the inaugural recipients were Graham Parker and Julie Covington. The Human League were the first group to win the award. Paul Young and Lisa Stansfield were the fist male and female solo artists to receive the combined award, winning in 1984 and 1990 respectively. The current holder of the award is Wet Leg, who won in 2023. In January 2023, Sam Ryder became the first Eurovision artist to be nominated in this category.

History
The award was first presented in 1977 as two awards: British Male Newcomer and British Female Newcomer which were won by Graham Parker and Julie Covington. When the Brit Awards was held for the second time in 1982, these categories were combined and rules were changed so that groups were also eligible. The inaugural recipients of the new British Newcomer award were The Human League. From 2003 to 2019, the award was presented as British Breakthrough Act. The award received its current name Best New Artist starting in 2020, bringing it in line with similar international awards such as the Grammy Award for Best New Artist. Mabel and Dave are the only artists who have been nominated for this award more than once. Dave was nominated 2018 and 2020 and Mabel was nominated in both 2019 and 2020.

Winners and nominees

British Male/Female Newcomer (1977)

British Newcomer (1982–2002)

British Breakthrough Act (2003–2019)

Best New Artist (2020–present)

Notes
 Sam Smith (2014), Rag'n'Bone Man (2017) also won Brit Award for Rising Star
 Paul Young (1985), Ed Sheeran (2012, 2015), Ben Howard (2013) also won Brit Award for British Male Solo Artist
 Lisa Stansfield (1991–1992), Duffy (2009), Dua Lipa (2018, 2021) also won Brit Award for British Female Solo Artist
 Oasis (1996), Arctic Monkeys (2007–2008, 2014) also won Brit Award for British Group
 Blue (2003), Busted (2004) also won Brit Award for British Pop Act

References

Brit Awards
Music awards for breakthrough artist
Awards established in 1977
Awards established in 1982